Silent Sentinel is a 1929 American silent crime film directed by Alan James and starring Gareth Hughes and Josephine Hill.

Cast
 Champion the Dog as Champion  
 Gareth Hughes as Bob Benton  
 Josephine Hill as Grace Carlton  
 Walter Maly as Tom  
 Lew Meehan as Detective  
 Aline Goodwin as Maizie  
 Alfred Hewston as Warren Gordon  
 Eddie Brownell as Joe Carlton 
 Alice Covert as Mrs. Carlton  
 John Tansey as Convict  
 Edward Cecil as Chick  
 Jack Knight as Dick  
 George Morrell as Insurance man

References

Bibliography
 Michael R. Pitts. Poverty Row Studios, 1929-1940: An Illustrated History of 55 Independent Film Companies, with a Filmography for Each. McFarland & Company, 2005.(Online entry)

External links

1929 films
1929 crime films
American crime films
Films directed by Alan James
American silent feature films
Chesterfield Pictures films
American black-and-white films
1920s English-language films
1920s American films